The name South Manchester Synagogue refers to both an Orthodox Jewish community in south Manchester, England and to the buildings that it occupies. In 2002, the community relocated from synagogue buildings in the Fallowfield district of Manchester to new premises in Bowdon, Altrincham, Greater Manchester.

History 
South Manchester Synagogue was founded in 1872 by a group of people who wished to cater for those Ashkenazi families who lived south of Manchester city centre. In 1913, the congregation moved from premises in Sidney Street, Chorlton on Medlock, to a new building in the then semi-rural location of Wilbraham Road, Fallowfield. This was to be its home for nearly 90 years.

The synagogue flourished for many years in its new location, due in no small part to the arrival of successive waves of refugees from Europe in the 1930s. Such was the growth in membership, that an extension had to be built to the women's gallery, and later additional parallel services had to be held in the new synagogue hall during the High Holy Days. Membership peaked at over 800 during the 1970s.

The synagogue has a number of charismatic leaders, including for many years Rabbi Felix Carlebach, Chazan Solomon Morris and more recently Rabbi Yitzchok Rubin. That tradition of vibrant leadership was later continued by Rabbi Dovid Lewis and Chazan Michael Isdale.

Throughout its history, the synagogue has had to come to terms with demographic trends within the community. In the same way as the move to Fallowfield reflected the move of the membership out of the city centre, so its most recent history reflects the move of many members of the congregation to Hale, Bowdon and the surrounding area.

New synagogue building in Bowdon 
The South Manchester Synagogue building in Bowdon is a purpose-built contemporary building. Constraints posed by the compact site necessitated stacking the principal rooms – the galleried synagogue and a large communal hall – one above the other. Use was made of the sloping site to place the communal hall at lower-ground level and to create a sunken garden with a safe play area for children.

The main entrance is a glazed foyer with voids reaching down to the lower-ground floor and up to the first-floor entrance to the women's gallery, admitting daylight into the heart of the building.

The synagogue itself is square with the bimah set centrally in a traditional arrangement. The low pitched roof rises to a glazed lantern over the bimah with an exposed steel roof structure that further emphasises the latter's position and importance. The women's gallery is arranged on three sides of the main space and care has been taken to create a degree of intimacy while still being able to accommodate large numbers for major festivals.

The windows on each side of the women's gallery are fitted with stained glass windows by the Scottish artist John Clark. The windows represent Rosh Hashanah and Yom Kippur and the festivals of Sukkot, Pesach and Shavuot. Further stained glass windows are planned for the main entrance on the theme of the Exodus and for the three-storey atrium on the Shema. The Torah ark and Synagogue interior are all finished in oak to maintain the light, airy ambience of the building.

Alongside the synagogue at ground level is the library and Beth midrash in which weekday services are held. A retractable wall allows this area to become part of the main worship space, providing additional seating for Rosh Hashanah and Yom Kippur.

The synagogue was designed to enable access by both able-bodied and disabled people while still conforming to the requirements of Halacha. Sloping ramps provide ease of access to the main entrance and a lift has been installed with special programming for use on Shabbat. A mechitzah has also been installed on the ground floor for women unable to access the women's gallery.

Former synagogue building in Fallowfield 

The community's former synagogue building was in Wilbraham Road, Fallowfield. The result of a competition won by Joseph Sunlight, the synagogue was completed in 1913, and is a structure of diverse stylistic influences and innovative technical construction, as recognised in its Grade II listing.

Sunlight adopted the style of a Turkish mosque, complete with dome and minaret though interpreted in a modernist, it has even been said cubist, idiom. Sunlight confessed to quoting Hagia Sophia in Constantinople and the tower of Westminster Cathedral. The building marked a first in British synagogue construction in avoiding column supports for its 35 ft dome by the use of reinforced concrete in its span and the lattice girders supporting the cantilever gallery.

In 2003, the Fallowfield building became redundant, the congregation having relocated, and plans were drawn up by a charitable trust to convert it to a residential Jewish student centre. , the building is being renovated, with major changes to the interior. The ladies' gallery has been turned into a complete second floor to replace the function room previously in the annex, which is to be demolished.

References

External links
 
 South Manchester Synagogue on Jewish Communities and Records – UK (hosted by jewishgen.org).

1872 establishments in England
Ashkenazi Jewish culture in England
Ashkenazi synagogues
Buildings and structures in Trafford
Byzantine Revival synagogues
Grade II listed buildings in Manchester
Grade II listed religious buildings and structures
Orthodox synagogues in England
Religious organizations established in 1872
Synagogues in Manchester